Miguelmonneus insolitus is a species of beetle in the family Cerambycidae. It was described by Monné in 2001 and moved into its own genus in 2021.

References

Acanthoderini
Beetles described in 2001